Boil up is a traditional Māori food from Aotearoa New Zealand.

Boil-up traditionally is a broth/soup made from balanced combination of meat and bones (e.g. pork), with greens such as puha, watercress or cabbage, and kūmara or potatoes, boiled together, along with flour dumplings known as "Doughboys".

Origins 
In Polynesian cuisine, food was boiled in wooden bowls into which a red-hot stone was dropped. This was sufficient for heating liquids and pastes, but was insufficient to cook taro or pork; those foods were usually baked in an earth oven. The Māori carried these traditions to Aotearoa, making puddings of grated kūmara (called roroi) or mashed kiekie flower bracts in large wooden bowls.

When Pākehā settlers arrived from Europe, they brought with them new foods and iron cooking pots. Pigs and potatoes from Europe were rapidly adopted by Māori, who produced large quantities for trading with the settlers. As settler housing did not have the built-in coal ranges and ovens of Regency Britain, most cooking was done on a hearth, in a cast iron three-legged cauldron or camp oven. Camp ovens were imported in their hundreds from the 1850s, and were popular with Māori: they could be transported by waka or carried, and could stand on three feet in the embers or be hung by a chain. Camp ovens were used for making flour-and-sugar puddings, baking traditional rēwena bread, and for the first pork-and-potato boil ups.

References 

Māori cuisine
New Zealand cuisine
New Zealand soups